Turkmenistan competed in the 2008 Summer Olympics held in Beijing, People's Republic of China from August 8 to August 24, 2008. The country's flagbearer at the Games' opening ceremony was judoka Guwanç Nurmuhammedow.

Athletics

Men

Women

Key
Note–Ranks given for track events are within the athlete's heat only
Q = Qualified for the next round
q = Qualified for the next round as a fastest loser or, in field events, by position without achieving the qualifying target
NR = National record
N/A = Round not applicable for the event
Bye = Athlete not required to compete in round

Boxing

Judo

Shooting

Women

Swimming 

Men

Women

Weightlifting

See also
 Turkmenistan at the 2008 Summer Paralympics

References

Nations at the 2008 Summer Olympics
2008
Summer Olympics